The Apostolic Vicariate (or Vicariate Apostolic) of San Miguel de Sucumbíos is a missionary entity of the Roman Catholic Church. Its cathedral see, the Catedral Nuestra Señora del Cisne, is located in the city of Nueva Loja, Sucumbíos Province in Ecuador.

History
On 16 April 1924 Pope Pius XI established the Prefecture Apostolic of San Miguel de Sucumbíos from the Apostolic Vicariate of Napo. 
 
Pope John Paul II elevated it to an Apostolic Vicariate on 2 July 1984. It remains exempt, i.e. directly subject to the Holy See, not part of an ecclesiastical province.

Nomination conflict with the Ecuadorian state 
In October 2010, after López Marañon of the Discalced Carmelites retired at the mandatory age of 75, the Holy See appointed Rafael Ibarguren, of the Heralds of the Gospel as Apostolic Administrator (ad interim for the Ordinary) of the Vicariate Apostolic. Ecuadorian President Rafael Correa objected to the nomination as he considered Ibarguren 'ultraconservative and fundamentalist', he also feared that Ibarguren would destroy all the social work his predecessor had achieved. Correa asserted that he could veto the nomination of Ibarguren on the basis of a Modus vivendi agreement between Ecuador and the Holy See. The Episcopal Conference of Ecuador asserted otherwise. Relations between the two entities were strained and believers within Sucumbíos were divided in those supporting the Heralds of the Gospel and those who did not.
 
On 5 December 2011, Pope Benedict XVI named Paolo Mietto Apolostic Administrator. This member of the missionary Congregation of Saint Joseph was succeeded by a fellow Josephite Celmo Lazzari, the former Apostolic Vicar of neighbouring 'mother vicariate' Napo, as Apostolic vicar.

Incumbent Ordinaries
Apostolic prefects (all Discalced Carmelites (O.C.D.)
Pacifico del Carmine, O.C.D. † (21 May 1937 – 1954)
Manuel Gomez Frande, O.C.D. † (18 November 1955 – 1968)
Gonzalo López Marañon, O.C.D. † (26 June 1970 – see below)

Apostolic vicars
Gonzalo López Marañon, O.C.D. † (see above – 30 October 2010)Apostolic Administrator Rafael Ibarguren Schindler (30 October 2010 – 10 February 2012)Apostolic Administrator'' Paolo Mietto, C.S.I. (10 February 2012 – 21 November 2013)
 Celmo Lazzari, C.S.I. (21 November 2013 – incumbent)

See also 
 Roman Catholicism in Ecuador

Sources and References 

Roman Catholic dioceses in Ecuador
Christian organizations established in 1924